Bigfin squids are a group of rarely seen cephalopods with a distinctive morphology. They are placed in the genus Magnapinna and family Magnapinnidae. Although the family is known only from larval, paralarval, and juvenile specimens, some authorities believe adult specimens have also been seen. Several videos have been taken of animals nicknamed the "long-arm squid", which appear to have a similar morphology. Since none of the seemingly adult specimens has ever been captured or sampled, it remains uncertain if they are of the same genus or only relatives.

These appendages are held perpendicular to the body, creating "elbows." How the squid feeds is yet to be discovered.

Physical specimens 
The first record of this family comes from a specimen (Magnapinna talismani) caught off the Azores in 1907. Due to the damaged nature of the find, little information could be discerned, and it was classified as a mastigoteuthid, first as Chiroteuthopsis talismani and later as Mastigoteuthis talismani. In 1956, a similar squid (Magnapinna sp. C) was caught in the South Atlantic, but little was thought of it at the time. The specimen was illustrated in Alister Hardy's The Open Sea (1956), where it was identified as Octopodoteuthopsis.

During the 1980s, two additional immature specimens were found in the Atlantic (Magnapinna sp. A), and three more were found in the Pacific (Magnapinna pacifica). Researchers Michael Vecchione and Richard Young were the chief investigators of the finds, and eventually linked them to the two previous specimens, erecting the family Magnapinnidae in 1998, with Magnapinna pacifica as the type species. Of particular interest was the very large fin size, up to 90% of the mantle length, that was responsible for the animals' common name.

A single specimen of a fifth species, Magnapinna sp. B, was collected in 2006. Magnapinna sp. A was described as Magnapinna atlantica in 2006.

The genus was described from two juveniles and paralarva, none of which had developed the characteristic long arm tips. However, they did all have large fins, and were therefore named "magna pinna", meaning "big fin".

Sightings 
The first visual record of the long-arm squid was in September 1988. Both were filmed and photographed.

By comparison with the visible parts of the ROV, the squid was estimated to measure  with arms fully extended.

These videos did not receive any media attention; most were brief and fairly blurry. In May 2001, approximately ten minutes of crisp footage of a long-armed squid were acquired by ROV Tiburon, causing a flurry of attention when released.

Observations of Magnapinna sp. were made in the Great Australian Bight during towed camera and remote operated vehicle surveys in 2015 and 2017 respectively.

On 9 November 2021, a video of a long-armed squid was captured at a ridge feature off the West Florida Escarpment by an ROV from the NOAAS Okeanos Explorer as part of the Windows to the Deep 2021 expedition. Currently, there are officially 3 known species of bigfin squid. 

For the first time on 7 February 2023, a video of a long-arm squid moving suddenly was captured at a depth of 2,150 m (7,054 ft). In the video, the squid is observed to suddenly change its posture and its tentacles move very rapidly. It is unclear whether the ROV's water outflow pushed the animal, or if the video is a discovery of a new mechanism for the animal's own locomotion.

Anatomy
The specimens in the videos looked very distinct from all previously known squids. Uniquely among cephalopods, the arms and tentacles were of the same length and looked identical (similar to extinct belemnites). The appendages were also held perpendicular to the body, creating the appearance of strange "elbows". Most remarkable was the length of the elastic tentacles, which has been estimated at up to 15–20 times the mantle length. This trait is caused by filament coiling of the tentacles, a trait that is rare among similar species. Viewing close-ups of the body and head, it is apparent that the fins are extremely large, being proportionately nearly as big as those of bigfin squid larvae. While they do appear similar to the larvae, no specimens or samples of the adults have been taken, leaving their exact identity unknown. While their exact identity is unknown, all of the discovered specimens can be observed to have a brown-orange color body, translucent fins, near-white tentacles, and dark eyes. These species of squids are mainly identifiable by their long thin arms and specific colors. The squid also have a very unique brachial crown that sets them aside from the rest of other families that are known.

Feeding behaviour
Little is known about the feeding-behaviour of these squids. Scientists have speculated that the bigfin squid feeds by dragging their arms and tentacles along the seafloor and grabbing edible organisms from the floor. Alternatively, they may simply use a trapping technique, waiting passively for prey such as zooplankton, to bump into their arms (see Cephalopod intelligence). The diet of the bigfin squid is unknown. However, cephalopods are known to feed on crustaceans, jellyfish, and even other cephalopods.  

Footage from the Gulf of Mexico taken on February 7, 2023, which shows a bigfin squid displaying aggressive behavior towards and attacking an ROV, showing quick movements of its tentacles, may suggest that bigfin squids may play a role as more active predators than previously thought.

See also
 Cephalopod
 Cephalopod size
 Deep sea creature

References

External links

 Tree of Life Web Project: Magnapinna
 Cephalopods in Action: Long-armed squid videos
 Magnapinna Squid Attack

Cenozoic cephalopods
Cephalopod genera
Extant Pliocene first appearances
Squid
Pliocene molluscs